Bilbor (Hungarian pronunciation :) is a commune in Harghita County, Transylvania, Romania. It is composed of two villages, Bilbor (Bélbor) and Răchitiș (Rakottyás).

Name
Its name is of Slavic origin, meaning white pine, derived from *bělъ, white and *borъ, pine.

Demographics
The commune has an absolute ethnic Romanian majority. According to the 2002 census, it has a population of 2,859, of which 99.44% or 2,843 are Romanians. Hungarians represent 0.55% or 16 individuals.

Religion
As of the 2002 census, the population was divided as follows:
Romanian Orthodox - 2845
Roman Catholic - 12
Greek Catholic - 1
Evangelical Lutheran - 1

Natives
 Romul Nuțiu
 Octavian Codru Tăslăuanu

References

External links
Commune website

Communes in Harghita County
Localities in Transylvania
Place names of Slavic origin in Romania